Siri (minor planet designation: 332 Siri) is a main belt asteroid in orbit around the Sun. It was discovered by German astronomer Max Wolf on 19 March 1892 in Heidelberg. The origin of this asteroid's name is unclear. On October 5, 2092, 332 Siri will pass  from the asteroid 29 Amphitrite with a relative velocity of 2.054 kilometers per second.

References

External links 
 Lightcurve plot of 332 Siri, Palmer Divide Observatory, B. D. Warner (2008)
 Asteroid Lightcurve Database (LCDB), query form (info )
 Dictionary of Minor Planet Names, Google books
 Asteroids and comets rotation curves, CdR – Observatoire de Genève, Raoul Behrend
 Discovery Circumstances: Numbered Minor Planets (1)-(5000) – Minor Planet Center
 
 

000332
Discoveries by Max Wolf
Named minor planets
000332
18920319